O'Beirne may refer to:

Frank O'Beirne (1898–1978), farmer, businessman, Irish Republican activist and Fianna Fáil politician in County Sligo
Joseph O'Beirne (1900–1980), Irish professional footballer who played as an inside forward
Kate O'Beirne (1949–2017), Washington editor of National Review
Paul O'Beirne (also known by the pseudonym Apollo 9), American saxophonist notable as a member of Rocket from the Crypt
Thomas O'Beirne (1749–1823), Anglican bishop, Bishop of Ossory from 1795 to 1798 when he was translated to Meath

See also
Beirne (disambiguation)
Mount O'Beirne, located on the border of Alberta and British Columbia